Live Bites is a live album by the German hard rock band Scorpions, released in 1995.

It was recorded between 1988 and 1994 in Leningrad (Russia), San Francisco (US), Mexico City (Mexico), Berlin (Germany) and Munich (Germany).

Track listing

International version

US version

Personnel
Scorpions
Klaus Meine – vocals
Rudolf Schenker – rhythm guitar, lead guitar, 6 & 12-string acoustic guitars, backing vocals
Matthias Jabs – lead guitar, rhythm guitar, 6 & 12-string acoustic guitars, backing vocals
Herman Rarebell – drums, keyboards on "Concerto in V"
Ralph Rieckermann – bass guitar, upright bass, backing vocals

Additional musician
Francis Buchholz – bass on "Rhythm of Love" and "Living for Tomorrow"

Studio session musicians
Luke Herzog – keyboards on "Edge of Time"
Richard Baker – orchestration programming on "Heroes Don't Cry"
Fred White, Linda McCrary, Alfie Silas, Ricky Nelson – choir on "Heroes Don't Cry"
Kinderchor Majell Lustenhouwer – children's choir on "White Dove"
Rocq-E Harrel – additional vocals on "White Dove"

Production
Keith Olsen – producer (studio tracks)
Erwin Musper – engineer, mixing
Sander van der Heide – mastering

Charts

Album

Singles

References

Scorpions (band) live albums
1995 live albums
PolyGram live albums
Mercury Records live albums